My Greatest Songs may refer to:

My Greatest Songs (Etta James album)
My Greatest Songs, Pat Boone discography
My Greatest Songs, Paul Anka
My Greatest Songs, Connie Francis discography
My Greatest Songs, Patsy Cline posthumous discography